The Thunstetten Commandery was a medieval monastery of the Knights Hospitaller in the Swiss municipality of Thunstetten in the Canton of Bern. Today the lands house Thunstetten Castle, which is a national landmark of Switzerland.

History

Commandery
The commandery was established prior to 1210 for the Knights Hospitaller by an unknown benefactor.  During the 13th and 14th centuries, the commandery lands grew with donations and purchases from local nobles.  At the height of their power, they owned land in  Oberaargau, the Bernese Seeland and around Solothurn.  They bought vineyards in Twann and rights over village churches in Lotzwil, Ursenbach, Egerkingen, Aetigen, Rohrbach and Waldkirchen (now part of Niederbipp).

The commandery was granted limited rights of citizenship by its neighboring cities of Wangen an der Aare (1320) and Bern (starting in 1329).

The commandery complex consisted of the commander's house (now the rectory), the 18th-century Church of St. John the Baptist—although the belltower possibly dates from the founding of the commandery—and the monastery building.  The commandery at Thunstetten was often under the authority of commander at Münchenbuchsee, though each house would have its own prior. In 1274 Thunstetten was granted its own seal.

At the start of the Protestant Reformation in Switzerland in 1528, Peter Englisberg, the commander of both houses at the time, supported the secularization of this commandery as well as his own, for which he received a castle as his reward. The lands of the commandery were seized and became the property of the City of Bern.

Schloss Tunstettin

The lands of the former commandery were acquired about 1710 by Landvogt Hieronymus von Erlach, who proceeded to have Thunstetten Castle built on its grounds over the next several years. He then had the lands of the estate established by the city as his domain, in exchange for his prior one in Inkwil. The castle is listed as a Swiss heritage site of national significance.

The castle was built as a country manor house in the Bernese Oberaargau, by the noted architect Joseph Abeille. The castle remained with the Erlach family until 1746.  From that year until 1970, it passed through the hands of numerous owners.  In 1970 the Stiftung Schloss Thunstetten (Thunstetten Castle Foundation) took over management of the building and grounds. Today rooms in the castle or the entire castle can be rented for events or meetings.

References

Christian monasteries established in the 13th century
Preceptories of the Knights Hospitaller in Switzerland
Buildings and structures in the canton of Bern
1528 disestablishments in Europe
16th-century disestablishments in the Old Swiss Confederacy